Michael James Milbury (born June 17, 1952) is an American former professional ice hockey player and current sports announcer. He played for twelve seasons in the National Hockey League (NHL), all for the Boston Bruins. He helped the Bruins reach the Stanley Cup Final in 1977 and 1978.

He later served as assistant general manager under Harry Sinden and head coach for Boston, as well as general manager and head coach for the New York Islanders. He served as a television color commentator and analyst for the NHL on NBC from 2007 to 2021.

Playing career

Colgate University
Milbury was a three-year letterman at Colgate University from 1972 to 1974. A defenseman who wore uniform number 7, he was the team's co-leader in assists with 19 in his junior year. As senior captain, he had his best season with the Red Raiders with 30 points (4 goals, 26 assists). He also led the squad in penalty minutes in both campaigns with 68 in 1973 and 85 in 1974. His totals in 76 games played were 6 goals, 55 assists, 61 points and 203 penalty minutes.

Boston Bruins
Immediately after the conclusion of his college hockey career, Milbury played in five games with the Boston Braves, the Bruins' top farm team, in 1974. He signed with the Bruins as a free agent on November 5, 1974, and spent the next two campaigns with the Rochester Americans, the team's new American Hockey League (AHL) affiliate. In both seasons he led the club in penalty minutes with 246 in 1975 and 199 in 1976, finishing fourth and third respectively in the AHL.

Milbury was promoted to the Bruins late in the 1975–76 season, playing in eleven of twelve Stanley Cup playoff matches. Prior to the following NHL campaign, he was a member of the United States team at the inaugural 1976 Canada Cup, getting a goal and three assists in five contests.

In his first three full years with the Bruins, his heavily aggressive style of play was a perfect fit for the overachieving team coached by Don Cherry and featuring similar tough players such as Terry O'Reilly, John Wensink and Stan Jonathan. Milbury helped his team reach consecutive Stanley Cup Finals in 1977 and 1978, with Boston losing both times to the Montreal Canadiens in four and six games respectively.

In his twelve seasons as a defenseman for the Bruins, he appeared in the postseason eleven times. He accumulated more than 200 penalty minutes in 1981 (222) and 1983 (216) and surpassed 100 six other times. He also served as the club's representative with the NHL Players' Association and was outspoken on several controversial issues, notably the role of Alan Eagleson.

Shoe incident
Milbury gained notoriety for what occurred following a 4–3 Bruins victory over the New York Rangers at Madison Square Garden on December 23, 1979. During an on-ice fray between the players from both sides, a Rangers fan cut Stan Jonathan's face with a rolled-up program and grabbed his hockey stick. Terry O'Reilly climbed over the Plexiglas and went into the stands in pursuit of the offender, followed by Peter McNab and other teammates. Milbury, who had actually reached the visitors locker room when his teammates started going into the stands, raced back to join his colleagues in the brawl. He caught the unruly spectator, removed one of his shoes and, while holding the heel end, slapped him hard once with the sole side before being restrained. Subsequently, NHL president John Ziegler suspended O'Reilly for eight games and McNab and Milbury for six, with each being fined $500. This incident also resulted in the installation of higher glass panels enclosing rinks in hockey arenas.

Coaching career

Boston Bruins
Milbury became head coach of the Boston Bruins in the 1989–90 season, leading the team to the Presidents' Trophy and an appearance in the Stanley Cup Finals. He was named Executive of the Year by the Sporting News.

He was the head coach of the Wales Conference team at the 1991 All-Star Game, where he generated some controversy by including enforcer Chris Nilan and checker Brian Skrudland ahead of players such as Kirk Muller and Guy Lafleur. However, Nilan and Skrudland both missed the game due to injury. As a result of Milbury's controversial roster picks, the league's board of governors changed their policy so that future teams would be chosen by committee.

Boston College
On March 30, 1994, Boston College announced that Mike Milbury would become the head coach of the hockey team, replacing Steve Cedorchuk.  However, Milbury abruptly left the job at Boston College before coaching a game, citing "philosophical differences" with the school's athletics department in a press conference held on June 2, 1994.  BC eventually hired legendary coach Jerry York, then the head coach at Bowling Green University, to replace Milbury, while Milbury took work as a television analyst.

New York Islanders
Milbury was hired as the Islanders' coach in 1995 and within three months became the general manager as well, but he turned the coaching duties over to Rick Bowness in January 1997. During several of the years that Milbury served as Islanders GM, the team's ownership mandated that he operate the team on an austere budget. In 1999, he was forced to trade star scorer Žigmund Pálffy because team owners no longer wanted to pay his multimillion-dollar contract.

However, Milbury has also been criticized for the many seemingly poor decisions he made in which payroll or orders from upper management were not factors. Many young players and prospects that Milbury traded away went on to have distinguished careers, often eclipsing those of the players he received in return. He traded away defensemen Zdeno Chara, Wade Redden, Bryan Berard, Eric Brewer, Darius Kasparaitis, and Bryan McCabe; goaltenders Roberto Luongo and Tommy Salo; as well as forwards Olli Jokinen, Todd Bertuzzi, Tim Connolly, Jean-Pierre Dumont, and Raffi Torres. Milbury has also come under fire for his poor draft-day decisions such as choosing Rick DiPietro first overall in 2000 over Dany Heatley and Marian Gaborik, as well as his decision to include the 2001 second overall draft pick (Jason Spezza) as part of the Alexei Yashin trade.

In June 2006, Milbury stepped down as Islanders GM to accept a position as senior vice president of Charles Wang's sports holdings. In an appearance on Mike and the Mad Dog, Wang did not challenge the hosts' suggestion that he had fired Milbury. In May 2007, Milbury resigned his position with Wang, saying that he missed making hockey-related decisions and would be open to a hockey operations job in another organization.

Television work
American networks NESN, NBC and Versus, plus Canada's TSN, hired Milbury as a studio analyst for the 2007–08 season. He also served as the studio analyst for the Boston Bruins, and for the past two years, he has participated in the broadcast of the Winter Classic.

In July 2008, Milbury signed a two-year contract with the Canadian Broadcasting Corporation's Hockey Night in Canada. He also served as color commentator for “NHL on NBC” telecasts involving the Boston Bruins with Kenny Albert and Emmy Award-winning "Inside-the-Glass" reporter Pierre McGuire.

In 2009, Milbury twice stated that "a ban on fighting would lead to the pansification" of the NHL, and in so doing upset Egale Canada, a gay rights group.

Comments about women
Since joining NBC, Milbury has made several comments and jokes about and at the expense of women and women in hockey.

In 2011, he referred to Vancouver Canucks twins Daniel Sedin and Henrik Sedin as Thelma & Louise. Henrik responded with a jab at Milbury for trading Roberto Luongo as GM of the Islanders, while Daniel said, "I don't know how he looks at women. I would be pretty mad if I was a woman."

Commenting on an April 2012 game between the Pittsburgh Penguins and Philadelphia Flyers, he said that then-Penguins coach Dan Bylsma "should have taken off his skirt and gone over (to the Flyers' bench)" to confront his counterpart, Peter Laviolette.

In August, 2020, Milbury made more disparaging comments about women during the 2020 Stanley Cup Playoffs (see section below), which ultimately led to his firing by NBC.

P. K. Subban
Milbury has received criticism for comments he made about P. K. Subban, in 2017. In April, Milbury called Subban "a clown" and said he deserved a "rap on the head" from his head coach for his pre-game routine which included dancing on the ice during warmups, comments which were viewed by several outlets as racist. During a 2017 Stanley Cup Finals game in June between Subban's Nashville Predators and the Pittsburgh Penguins, Subban and Sidney Crosby engaged in a fight that ended with Subban's head bouncing off the ice. Milbury said after the game that Subban "had it coming." When the series moved to Nashville, several fans taunted Milbury over his comments, including some who claimed NBC tried to "bribe" them with a hat in return for handing over their signs that were critical of Milbury which might be picked up on camera.

2020 Stanley Cup Playoffs
During the 2020 Stanley Cup playoffs, Milbury made a series of controversial comments that attracted a wide range of responses, from mockery to calls for him to lose his job with NBC.

During an August 4 game between the Toronto Maple Leafs and Columbus Blue Jackets, Maple Leafs defenseman Jake Muzzin suffered an injury that Milbury believed he was faking. Milbury encouraged him to stay on the ice and attempt to draw a whistle. Muzzin was ultimately carted off the ice on a stretcher.

Following a 5-overtime, sudden death game between the Tampa Bay Lightning and Blue Jackets on August 11, Milbury tweeted that the NHL needed to adopt either a shootout or 3-on-3 format to speed up overtime in the playoffs. USA Today wrote that the comments "encapsulated what Milbury has been like during the Stanley Cup Playoffs: Out of touch, ill prepared, and an absolute embarrassment."

On August 15, Milbury criticized the decision made by Tuukka Rask of the Boston Bruins to opt out of the playoffs in the middle of a series, saying "(Nobody's) simply opted to leave the bubble just because they didn't want to be here and they needed to be with their family." This followed comments Milbury had made two weeks earlier, where he claimed to be a "fan" of Rask while questioning his commitment to hockey after watching an interview in which Rask talked about changing his newborn daughter's diapers. It was revealed four days later on August 19 that a medical emergency involving Rask's daughter drove him to leave the team.

On August 20, while calling a game between the Washington Capitals and New York Islanders, Milbury praised the playoff bubble system designed to isolate teams during the COVID-19 pandemic because there were "not even any women here to disrupt your concentration." His comments received quick condemnation from the NHL. Milbury apologized the next day, and NBC released a statement saying the issue had been addressed, though they did not publicly elaborate any further, nor did they indicate whether Milbury would face any discipline. The Washington Post reported that NBC had removed Milbury from that evening's broadcast schedule and did not announce the following weekend's broadcasting teams until Saturday morning. Milbury announced on August 22 that he would be stepping away from the broadcast booth for the remainder of the playoffs, so as not to be a distraction. On January 11, 2021, NBC announced that Milbury's tenure with the network was done and he would not be part of its broadcast lineup for the 2021 NHL season, its final season broadcasting NHL games.

In a wide-ranging interview with The Boston Globe in July, 2021, Milbury defended his original comments, saying "I want to explain the comment from that day. As a player and coach in the league, I’ve been on a lot of road trips and around a lot of guys that are young, fit, well-compensated, have celebrity status, and when they go on the road they play hard and they party hard. And a lot of their attention is on women, and I certainly don’t mean that in a bad way," and added, "What if I had said there aren’t any dogs here to distract the players? Or any wives? Or children? Do I have to describe the whole pantheon of the human race in order for it to be politically correct?"

Personal life

Assault charge
In December 2011, Milbury was charged on three counts stemming from an incident taking place on December 9, 2011 during a Pee-Wee hockey game he was coaching-- assault and battery on a child, threats to commit a crime, and disorderly conduct. He was never arrested. According to The Boston Herald, Milbury, an assistant coach for the Boch Blazers Pee-Wee hockey team, intervened in a fight on the ice during the game between his own son and a 12-year-old boy from the opposing team. Milbury allegedly "charged out onto the rink and verbally berated and grabbed and shook the 12-year-old opposing player." The boy's mother described Milbury's actions as "horrific," while his father accused Milbury of grabbing and shaking his son, and lifting him above the ice for thirty seconds. Milbury, through his lawyer, denied all charges. The owner of the Blazers defended Milbury's actions, saying he was told Milbury "did everything right... [he] didn't touch any kid inappropriately." NBC and Milbury reached a mutual agreement to take Milbury off air while he dealt with the situation.

Milbury appeared before a clerk magistrate in Brookline District Court in late December, 2011 to answer the charges. After a closed-door hearing which lasted several hours, the magistrate determined there wasn't enough evidence to sustain any of the three charges, which were all dropped. Milbury expressed gratitude for the court's findings, and affirmed that he believed he acted responsibly as a "supervisor" of the ice (and claimed the referee had already left the rink), and said he would do the same thing if the situation arose in the future.

Career statistics

Regular season and playoffs

International

NHL coaching record

References

External links
 
 

1952 births
Living people
American ice hockey coaches
American men's ice hockey defensemen
Boston Braves (AHL) players
Boston Bruins coaches
Boston Bruins players
Boston Bruins announcers
Colgate Raiders men's ice hockey players
Colgate University alumni
Sportspeople from Boston
National Hockey League broadcasters
New York Islanders coaches
New York Islanders executives
Rochester Americans players
Ice hockey people from Massachusetts
Undrafted National Hockey League players
Ice hockey people from Boston
Ice hockey coaches from Massachusetts